Lawrence George Rowe (born 8 January 1949) is a former West Indian cricketer. A stylish top order batsman, he also played for Jamaica and Derbyshire in his cricketing career. Rowe was later named as one of Jamaica's top five cricketers of the 20th century.

Playing career
Rowe made his debut for Jamaica in the 1968–69 cricketing season. He then made history on his Test match debut against New Zealand at Sabina Park, Kingston in 1972, scoring 214 and 100 not out, the first time that a cricketer had scored a double and single century on Test debut. It also gave him a batting average of 314 after his first Test match.

During 1974 Rowe scored 302 versus England at Barbados' Kensington Oval. This was and still remains the highest score by a West Indian at Kensington Oval. He also became one of only four West Indians to have scored a triple century, with the others being Garfield Sobers, Chris Gayle and Brian Lara.

On his arrival in Australia for the 1975–76 tour Rowe was being hailed as the best batsman in the world. A century in his second Test innings in Australia maintained his average at over 70 runs per innings and it seemed to confirm his reputation. The team was humiliated by the Australian side over the rest of the series and Rowe never regained his previously devastating form.

Rowe was a West Indies batting "hero" in the days before Viv Richards. He was known to whistle while he batted though he seemed to be a bit injury prone. During 1974 he started to suffer from astigmatism along with an allergy to grass. As well he dislocated his shoulder while playing against England in 1980.

Playing between 1972 and 1980, Rowe scored a total of 2,047 runs at an average of 43 in his test match career. He also featured for the Windies in 11 One Day Internationals. Rowe played for Derbyshire in the English County Championship and also joined World Series Cricket, where he scored 175 in one match for the WSC West Indies XI. 

Rowe later captained two rebel tours to South Africa. This came during apartheid when the country was isolated from world sport. The West Indies Cricket Board (WICB) thereafter banned the side's players for life, though this ban was eventually lifted in 1989. The Windies rebels twice toured South Africa in both the 1982–83 and 1983–84 seasons. While they lost the 50 over and drew the first class contests in their first tour, the Windies rebels went on to win both series in their subsequent tour. Soon after such Rowe migrated and permanently settled in Miami, US where he eventually became a successful businessman.

During the lunch break of the first Test between West Indies and India on 20 June 2011, Rowe was honoured when the Sabina Park stadium was named after him, in a ceremony that also honoured Michael Holding and Courtney Walsh. He took the opportunity to apologise on behalf of the rebel West Indian team, saying:

 "...Today I sincerely apologise to the cricketing fraternity of Jamaica, the Caribbean and the rest of the world."
However, after much protest Lindel Wright, the JCA president, stated their decision was revoked, after Rowe stated publicly that he saw nothing wrong with his decision to tour apartheid South Africa.

Playing style

As an elegant right-handed batsman Rowe, also known as "Yagga", was described by Michael Holding, his teammate, as "the best batsman I ever saw". It was felt that his ability was so extraordinary that Gary Sobers believed he could have been the greatest of all West Indian batsmen. At one game Rowe hit a ball so cleanly that it followed a level trajectory like a guided missile over the boundary for six. Gideon Haigh describes the incident:
Early in his innings against England at Kensington Oval, Bridgetown, Barbados, in March 1974, he received a bouncer from Bob Willis. He smashed it flat into the stand at square leg; it travelled most of the way at head height. His 302 took only 430 hectic deliveries, with 36 further boundaries.

Personal life
Rowe is the founder of the Lawrence Rowe Foundation, which aims to assist at-risk kids.

References

External links
 Lawrence Rowe interviewed by Caribbeancricket.com
 Article on Lawrence Rowe at Caribbeancricket.com
 Cricinfo statistics for Lawrence Rowe
 Stats Rleague

1949 births
Living people
Derbyshire cricketers
Jamaican cricketers
International Cavaliers cricketers
West Indies One Day International cricketers
West Indies Test cricketers
Sportspeople from Kingston, Jamaica
World Series Cricket players
West Indian cricket captains
Cricketers who made a century on Test debut
Jamaica cricketers